The 2012 Trinidad and Tobago Classic was the eighth season of the TOYOTA Classic, which is a knockout tournament competition for teams in Trinidad and Tobago's TT Pro League and the National Super League. The tournament began on 23 November with 16 teams (8 each from the Pro League and Super League) competing in single elimination matches until the final on 7 December. W Connection entered as the tournament's defending champion having defeated T&TEC with a penalty shootout after the match ended 0–0.

Qualification

Every club from the TT Pro League automatically qualified for the competition. In addition, following the conclusion of the National Super League season, the top eight teams ranked according to the league table qualified. All teams entered the competition at the first round.

The draw for the first round for the eighth edition of the tournament was conducted by Pro League CEO Dexter Skeene on 20 November 2012, at the Hasely Crawford Stadium VIP Lounge. The 16 teams in the competition, valued at TT$70,000 in total sponsorship, were drawn into four groups. Each Pro League club was drawn with a club from the National Super League for the first round of the single-elimination tournament. In addition, the top four clubs in each league's table were drawn as the home team for their first round fixture.

The following clubs have qualified for this year's edition of the TOYOTA Classic:

Schedule
The schedule for the 2012 TOYOTA Classic, as announced by the TT Pro League and National Super League:

Bracket

Results
All matches were played over two 45 minute halves, and in the process if the match were drawn at the end of regulation time, penalty kicks determined the winner.

First round
The first round of the competition witnessed three giant-killers from the Super League surprising their Pro League competition after Central FC, Police, and St. Ann's Rangers were booted from the Classic following defeats to Westside Super Starz, Stokely Vale, and WASA respectively. Defending champions W Connection advanced easily into the quarterfinals with a 5–0 win over Defence Force from the Super League. Joevin Jones and Jerrel Britto provided a brace each in support of the Savonetta Boys''' win. However, the Soldiers' Pro League counterparts recorded a clean sheet against 1976 FC Phoenix. The Morvant/Laventille Stallions progressed into the quarterfinals following a hard fought 3–2 victory over 1.FC Santa Rosa. In the other first round matches, North East Stars defeated Siparia Spurs 2–0 at Manny Ramjohn Stadium and T&TEC won 4–3 on a penalty shootout over Joe Public after the matched ended 1–1 in regulation.

Quarterfinals
The upset of the tournament occurred on 27 November 2012 in the quarterfinals when defending CFU Club Championship holders Caledonia AIA were eliminated by Stokely Vale. The Super League club won 6–5 in a penalty shootout after the match ended 3–3 after 90 minutes. North East Stars used six goals to prevail over T&TEC in a high scoring affair between the two Pro League sides. The two other quarterfinal matches witnessed a hat-trick from Josimar Belgrave to power Defence Force to a 7–0 win over Westside Super Starz. In addition, W Connection recorded another clean sheet 4–0 over WASA to advance into the semifinals.

Semifinals
In the first semifinal match on 30 November 2012, the giant-killers of Stokely Vale were eliminated from the tournament following a 4–1 loss on penalties after a regulation tie 1–1 against North East Stars.  The Sangre Grande Boys took the early lead with a goal from Cornell Glen four minutes from half-time and marked his third of the competition in as many games. Stokely Vale fought back in the second half and equalized in the sixtieth minute from Tyrone Manning. The match ended 1–1 after regulation and was decided on penalty kicks. Cleon John saved two penalties in the shootout which allowed North East Stars to cruise in the penalty shootout with successful efforts from Cornell Glen, Elijah Manners, Kerry Baptiste, and Seon Power. Defence Force recorded its third consecutive clean sheet after a 3–0 victory over defending TOYOTA Classic champions W Connection.  The Soldiers used a goal from Rodell Elcock in the 30th minute to lead 1–0 at the break. The scoreline lasted well into the second half before Kevon Carter scored fifteen minutes from time to give Defence Force a 2–0 lead late in the match. Jerwyn Balthazar secured the win 3–0 in the 85th minute with a goal from outside the penalty area.

Final
In the final held on 7 December 2012 at the Hasely Crawford Stadium, North East Stars defeated Defence Force 4–2 in a penalty shootout following a 2–2 draw in regulation. The win marked the Sangre Grande Boys' first title in the TOYOTA Classic after having finished runners-up in the 2010 final. North East Stars trailed late in the match 1–2 to the Teteron Boys'' before a late equalizer from Keryn Navarro in second half stoppage time sent the match into penalties. In the penalty shootout, Stars goalkeeper Cleon John saved a pair of penalty kicks from Rodell Elcock and Aklie Edwards and was later named the most valuable player of the tournament. With four goals in the competition, Jerrel Britto of W Connection was named the tournament's top goalscorer.

References

External links
Official Website

2012 TOYOTA Classic
Trinidad and Tobago Classic
Classic